George Albert Wright (4 February 1920 – August 2000) was an English footballer who played as a forward in the Football League for Cardiff City and Hull City around World War II. He died in Sheffield in August 2000 at the age of 80.

Career
Wright played for Cardiff City, and also guested for both Stoke City and Port Vale during the war. He made fifteen guest appearances for Vale between August and December 1944 and also made a guest appearance in March 1946. After he left Ninian Park in 1946, he moved on to Frank Buckley's Hull City. He scored one goal in four Third Division North appearances for the "Tigers", before departing Boothferry Park at the end of the 1946–47 season.

Career statistics
Source:

References

1920 births
2000 deaths
Footballers from Sheffield
English footballers
Association football forwards
Cardiff City F.C. players
Stoke City F.C. wartime guest players
Port Vale F.C. wartime guest players
Hull City A.F.C. players
English Football League players